Shellshock: Nam '67 is a 2004 third-person shooter video game developed by Guerrilla Games and published by Eidos Interactive for Microsoft Windows, PlayStation 2, and Xbox.

Plot
The game starts in January 1967 in Saigon, South Vietnam. A CH-47 Chinook containing Caleb "Cal" Walker, the game's protagonist, and other G.I.s, lands at Tan Son Nhut Air Base in southern Saigon. Walker, along with his squad mate, Private "Psycho" Kowalski, are chosen by Colonel Salter, the CO, to participate in an air assault on a Viet Cong encampment within Kon Tum province. Walker and Kowalski are put under the command of Lieutenant O'Brien along with another G.I. nicknamed "Short Timer". As Caleb and his squad proceed through the area, a friendly fire incident, involving flawed mortar coordinates, forces another G.I. named Tompkins, to join the squad. Along with the help of a special operations squad made up of Sergeant Ramirez, "Tick Tock" and "Eyeball", they help Walker and the others clear out the VC encampment. The encampment is soon after converted to a fire base, which serves as a headquarters for Walker and his unit.

Soon after, Walker's squad is tasked with investigating VC activity in a nearby village. The squad is also charged with finding a journalist who had recently gone missing in the village. After learning about the dangers of booby traps, the squad proceeds to the village. However, when the squad is ambushed in the rice paddies just outside the village, it becomes very clear that the villagers are aiding the VC. After clearing out the VC, Walker begins the task of searching for weapon caches within the village. After finding numerous hidden weapons and supplies, the squad begins searching for the missing journalist, and shortly thereafter find him being held hostage by several VC.

They jump to the next task of seizing an old French fort being used as a POW camp. After fighting through the valley entrance, and clearing out multiple bunkers after an ineffective napalm strike, they assault the fort. Walker explores the basement and finds the POWs; after freeing them from their cells, he discovers one tied to chair with obvious signs of torture. He tells Walker that the NVA has planted explosives in the basement in an attempt to demolish the fort. He escapes with seconds to spare. The squad is then given orders to defend the fort from NVA and VC attacks. Later that night, The enemy attacks. Tompkins is sniped at the start of the attack and O'Brien is hacked to death with machetes in full view of Walker's squad. The attackers are finally repelled after Special Forces arrive.

The next morning, Walker is told to report to Sergeant Ramirez and joins Special Forces. They take on subversive, rescue, and assault missions. Walker's final mission is to defeat General Diem, the game's main antagonist. He succeeds and delivers Diem's severed head to the base. Afterwards, Walker's chopper is shot down en route to China Lake. Walker escapes from NVA captivity and helps fend off a massive attack on base camp by both NVA and VC forces. Finally, an air strike is called in, leaving Walker and Monty, a friendly South Vietnamese soldier, as the only survivors.

Reception

ShellShock: Nam '67 received "mixed or average" reviews, according to review aggregator Metacritic.

IGN found the game to have "many faults" and criticized the presentation of war as tasteless. Eurogamer also noted that the game was "a trivial representation of a bloody conflict for our personal entertainment" but thought that "when it hits the spot it's briefly thrilling" and admired the creators' ambition in at least attempting to make a game which was not bland and sanitized.

The game sold 800,000 copies.

A sequel entitled Shellshock 2: Blood Trails was released in 2009.

References

External links

Fiction set in 1967
2004 video games
Anti-war video games
Eidos Interactive games
Guerrilla Games games
PlayStation 2 games
PlayStation Network games
Single-player video games
Third-person shooters
Video games developed in the Netherlands
Vietnam War video games
Windows games
Xbox games
Video games set in Vietnam
Video games set in 1967